Mount Cripps is an extinct volcano located on the West Coast of Tasmania, Australia. 

Geology
Mount Cripps was a shield volcano of the Mount Read Volcanics on Tasmania West Coast. The last eruption was 500 million years ago.

References 

Volcanoes of Tasmania
Inactive volcanoes